The Hong Kong General Chamber of Commerce (HKGCC) was founded on 29 May 1861, and is the oldest and one of the largest business organizations in Hong Kong. It has around 4,000 corporate members, who combined employ around one-third of Hong Kong's workforce. It is a self-funding, not-for-profit organization that promotes and represents the interests of the Hong Kong business community. A core function of its work is to formulate recommendations on improving the business environment, which its 23 industry-specific committees constantly analyze and make regular submissions to HKSAR Government officials and policy makers.

The Chamber's key services are advocacy, events, networking and business services. It also issues Certificates of Origin, ATA Carnet, and Certificate of Business Identity among other business documentation services via its six branches around Hong Kong.

History

Foundation 
The Hong Kong General Chamber of Commerce was founded on 29 May 1861, just 20 years after the foundation of the Colony of Hong Kong with Alexander Perceval of British owned trading conglomerate Jardine, Matheson & Co as its first chairman. The original membership consisted of 62 companies.

At that inaugural meeting, the Chamber's role was stated to be:

"... to watch over and protect the general interests of Commerce, to collect information on all matters of interest to the Mercantile Community, and to use every means within its power for the removal of evils, the redress of grievances, and the promotion of the common good; to communicate with authorities and other thereupon; to form a code of practice whereby the transaction of business may be simplified and facilitated; to receive references; and to arbitrate between disputants -- the decisions in such references to be recorded for future guidance."At the Chamber's inauguration the annual subscription fee was HK$100 for firms and HK$50 for individuals. At that time a box at the theatre cost HK$20, chair coolies took C25 to hire, C10 bought one pound of steaks or one dozen eggs. The Chamber's first secretary, J.C. Baldwin, received a salary of HK$125 per month.

At the General Meeting held in May 1863 the Chairman, James Macandrew, proposed that specialist groups be established to address subjects affecting various industries. The idea continues to this day in the form of 23 special interest committees within the Chamber.

In 1867 the Chamber's Annual General Meeting was open to the press. From that year, Chamber matters were brought into the public domain.

2 January 1884, at a special General Meeting held at City Hall, Thomas Jackson, chief manager of the Hongkong Bank, was elected the first Chamber Legco representative, and the Chamber became the first "functional constituency" in Hong Kong's law making body.

Structure 
HKGCC is a member-led organization dedicated to improving the business environment in Hong Kong and its competitiveness. The General Committee is the governing body of the Chamber responsible for Chamber policies and fiscal management. Its membership comprises 24 members drawn from Hong Kong's leading business executives, professionals, bankers and industrialists.

Under the General Committee are 23 industry and specialist committees, whose members are experts in their particular industries. They provide advice and guidance to the General Committee on policy formation for Hong Kong.

Members who are eligible also elect HKGCC's representative to the Legislative Council to the Commercial (First) Functional Constituency.

Business Knowledge 
HKGCC regularly organizes seminars, roundtable forums and conferences (which are now held virtually due to Covid-19), as well as company visits, overseas business missions and networking events (pre-pandemic). On average it organizes around 500 events every year. It also regularly holds training programs to allow member companies’ staff to upgrade their skills and knowledge.

Greater Bay Area Survey 2020 
HKGCC, KPMG China, and HSBC commissioned YouGov to conduct a survey of 747 business executives in mainland China, Hong Kong and Macao to gauge their expectations for opportunities in Mainland China's rapidly developing Greater Bay Area (GBA). The technology and innovation sector is expected to benefit most from the development of the region, with most firms in this industry aiming to take advantage of the deep pool of talent the GBA offers. Financial services and trade and logistics complete the top three sectors seen as major beneficiaries of the GBA initiative.

Membership 
HKGCC's membership is composed of around 4,000 companies, which include multinational companies, SMEs and start-ups, from Hong Kong, Mainland China and internationally. Collectively they employ around 1 million people, or roughly one-third of Hong Kong's workforce. Over 50% of flagship corporations listed on the Hang Seng Index are members of HKGCC.

Membership Categories 
The HKGCC offers 4 different membership categories for businesses and individuals.

1) Full Membership: Covers all employees in the member company. Full members can apply to join and vote in committee elections, and the LegCo elections.

2) Individual Associate: Provides access to certain information and opportunities.

3) Overseas Associate: For companies from Mainland China and around the world.

4) CO Subscriber: Provides discounts for trade documentation services provided by HKGCC.

Business Documentation Services
The Chamber provides certification services in 6 districts in Hong Kong, and is the biggest location network in Hong Kong. It began issuing Certificates of Origin in 1920, and is the sole authorised organisation for issuing ATA Carnet documents. It also provides Document Endorsement, Consulate Endorsement Facilitation and Paper to EDI Conversion issued are fully recognized by consulates, banks and customs houses throughout the world.

Community engagement

Good Citizen Award
HKGCC has been the sole sponsor of the Good Citizen Award since its inception in 1973. The Award rewards citizens who have contributed to the safety of the community by assisting the police catch criminals. The scheme was set up as part of the first Fight Crime Campaign, funded by donations from Chamber members and the community. Over the years, more than 3,600 citizens have been commended for their bravery in combating crime.

Business-School Partnership Programme 
Established in 2001, the programme matches secondary schools with companies to allow students to get hands-on experience to gain a better understanding of the commercial world. Participating schools and companies jointly develop regular activities during an academic year and include company visits, leadership talks, interview workshops and internships.

Business Case Competition 
The annual Business Case Competition encourages university students and fresh graduates to use their creativity and knowledge to solve cases set by some of the Chamber's member companies. Each year the themes have a strong environmental and sustainability element.

List of Chairpersons

CEPA
In HKGCC's report “China’s Entry into the WTO and its Impact on Hong Kong Business”, released on 18 January 2000, one of the key recommendations was to explore the possibility of setting up a regional trade agreement (RTA), also sometimes called a “free trade agreement”, as a concrete means to enhance further integration of trade and economic relations between Hong Kong and Mainland China. After China's accession to the WTO in 2001, HKGCC once again presented the idea to Tung Chee-hwa, the then HKSAR Chief Executive. The idea struck a chord with Tung who then put forward the RTA concept to the Central Government. On 20 December 2001, Jiang Zemin, General Secretary of the Communist Party of China, told Tung that the Central Government formally agreed to the suggestion, and consultation would begin immediately.

In January 2002, discussions between the HKSAR and the Central governments formally began, and a regional trade agreement was hammered out and formally named “Mainland/Hong Kong Closer Economic Partnership Arrangement” or CEPA. HKGCC then submitted a paper entitled “Topwards a Regional Trade Agreement between China and HKSAR” to Antony Leung on 21 January 2002, put forward seven principles to guide the discussions on the RTA, emphasizing that CEPA must be compliant with WTO principles.

Despite being put on hold for months due to the outbreak of SARS during March – June 2003, negotiations resumed and CEPA's text was finally concluded by the Central and HKSAR government negotiators, and signed on 29 June 2003.

Environmental policy

The Chamber claims to support environmental protection. In partnership with Hong Kong Business Coalition on the Environment, the Clean Air Charter was introduced in 2005 to encourage Hong Kong and Guangdong companies to reduce air pollution. More than 600 companies have endorsed the Charter.

References

External links
The Hong Kong General Chamber of Commerce Official website
Clean Air Charter Official website
Certificates of Origin Services, HKGCC Official website
Customs & Excise Department, HKSAR Government Official website

Chambers of commerce in Hong Kong
1861 establishments in Hong Kong